A list of Ivorian fine artists known for the creation of artworks that are primarily visual in nature, including traditional media such as painting, sculpture, photography, and printmaking, as well as more recent genres, including installation art, performance art, body art, conceptual art, video art, and digital art.

Individuals

A
Aboudia

B 
Frédéric Bruly Bouabré (aka Cheik Nadro), artist
Jems Robert Koko Bi, sculptor
Armand Boua, painter

C 
Joana Choumali, photographer

D 
Charles Dago, photographer
Ananias Leki Dago, photographer 
Claudie Titty Dimbeng, abstract painter

F
Pierre Fakhoury, sculptor
Franck Abd-Bakar Fanny, photographer

G 
Gauz, photographer 
Emile Guebehi, sculptor

H
James Houra, painter

K 
Laetitia Ky, artist
Paul Kodjo, photographer

L
Christian Lattier, sculptor

M 
Mathile Moraeau, painter

O 
Valérie Oka, artist
O'Plérou, graphic designer

S 
Malick Sidibe, photographer
Paul Sika, photographer

W
Ouattara Watts, painter

Lists of artists by nationality
Ivorian artists
artists